Give Me the Stars is a 1945 British musical drama film directed by Maclean Rogers and starring Leni Lynn, Will Fyffe, Jackie Hunter and Olga Lindo. American Toni Martin travels to Scotland and finds herself looking after her cranky grandfather Hector MacTavish, and even taking over his music hall act.

Cast
 Leni Lynn - Toni Martin
 Will Fyffe - Hector MacTavish
 Jackie Hunter - Lyle Mitchell
 Olga Lindo - Lady Hester
 Emrys Jones - Jack Ross
 Margaret Vyner - Patricia Worth
 Anthony Holles - Achille Lebrun
 Grace Arnold - Mrs Gossage
 Patric Curwen - Sir John Worth
 Robert Griffith - Dick Winter
 Johnnie Schofield - Ted James
 Janet Morrison - Secretary
 Hal Gordon - Taxi Driver
 Joss Ambler - George Burns
 Hilda Bayley - Mr Ross
 Ben Williams - Grant

Critical reception
Allmovie wrote, "While tolerably produced, Give Me the Stars rather resembles an elongated music hall sketch. But Will Fyffe was enormously popular, and the film brought in the shillings."

References

External links

1945 films
1940s musical drama films
Films directed by Maclean Rogers
British musical drama films
British black-and-white films
1945 drama films
Films shot at British National Studios
1940s English-language films
1940s British films